Night Swim (stylized in all lowercase) is the debut studio album by Australian singer-songwriter Josef Salvat. It was first released only in France on 23 October 2015 by Columbia Records. An enhanced worldwide edition of the album was released on 19 February 2016.

Critical reception

Night Swim received generally positive reviews from music critics. Lisa Henderson of Clash magazine wrote that "throughout the album, there's a penchant for linear melodies and production that bubbles beneath the surface, which allows Salvat's compelling story telling to take center stage. But it's when that production surges upward, prompting the singer's melodies to take flight that you realize this was his intention all along; Josef Salvat's masterstroke is conjuring moments of chaos from complete calm, and the results are majestic." She added that Night Swim "may not be instant or immediately accessible but given repeat spins it reveals itself as a thrillingly original and utterly gripping LP." The Irish Times writer Lauren Murphy gave the album three out of five stars while adding that Salvat was "still figuring his own sound out".

Track listing
All tracks written by Josef Salvat except where noted.

Notes
  signifies a co-producer
  signifies an additional producer

Credits and personnel
 Josef Salvat – vocals, songwriting, additional production
 Rich Cooper – production
 Ben Mclusky – co-production
 Will Purton – co-production
 Mat Maitland – photography

Charts

Weekly charts

Year-end charts

Release history

References

External links
 [ Night Swim] at AllMusic
 

Josef Salvat albums
2015 debut albums
2016 debut albums
Columbia Records albums